The following is a list of flags of Venezuela.

National flags

Historical flags

Governmental flags

Military flags

Administrative divisions flags

Historical state flags

City and town flags

See also
List of anthems of Venezuela
Symbols of Venezuela

References

National symbols of Venezuela
Flags of Venezuela
Venezuela
F